"Lungi Dance" is an Indian song composed and sung by Indian rapper Yo Yo Honey Singh for the soundtrack of the 2013 Bollywood film Chennai Express. The soundtrack was officially released on 1 July 2013. The song is a tribute to Rajinikanth.

Release
"Lungi Dance" was released as the ninth single from the album. The launch of the original music of the film took place in Mumbai, where performances were seen by the film's music directors and cast members. The star-studded event's telecast rights were sold to a TV channel for INR48 crore (US$7.7 million). The song is said to have significantly more popularised the lungi,  a traditional dress in India.

Lyrics

The song was composed by Yo Yo Honey Singh, as a tribute to actor Rajinikanth.

Critical response
"Lungi Dance" received mainly mixed reviews from critics in India. Mohar Basu of Koimoi wrote in his review, "I am quite assured that not every Rajni fan has Lungi as their favorite attire and neither will they appreciate Lassi in their coconut! Not that I was expecting meaning in the lyrics of the song, but the song's words are as meaningless as the aimless Deepika Padukone shaking her leg in this too-desperate-to-be-funny song." The Firstpost review said, "I may have to go swallow some Kafka and Faulkner after this column to feel smart again, but at least I know that I have done my Patient Zero duty in spreading the Lungi Dance virus. Thalaivar, everyone!

Controversy
The film's music composing duo, Vishal–Shekhar, were under the impression that they were the only musicians working on Chennai Express. Meanwhile, Honey Singh was asked by the film director to perform in the promotional song of "Lungi Dance". When rumours surfaced about Honey Singh's involvement, Vishal Dadlani tweeted, "It's hilarious and pathetic how desperately this tacky rape-rapper is trying to ride on the fame of SRK and Chennai Express (sic)". The rumour turned out to be true and the composers felt cheated. Dadlani and Shekhar Ravjiani did not promote the film's music nor attended the film's promos.

References

2013 songs
Indian songs
Hindi film songs
Yo Yo Honey Singh songs
Pop-folk songs